David Robert Suetterlein (born January 4, 1985) is an American politician, currently serving as a Republican member of the Senate of Virginia. He previously worked on the campaign and senate staff of Ken Cuccinelli and on the senate staff of his predecessor, Ralph K. Smith.

Electoral history

References

External links
 
 
Official Legislative website

1985 births
Grove City College alumni
Living people
Republican Party Virginia state senators
People from Roanoke County, Virginia
21st-century American politicians